Haplogroup Q-Z780 is a subclade of the Y-DNA Haplogroup Q-L54. Q-Z780 is defined by the presence of the Z780 Single Nucleotide Polymorphism (SNP).

Distribution 
Q-Z780 has descendants across much of the pre-Columbian Americas. It is the second most common branch of Q-M242 in the Americas. The Anzick child who lived 12,600 years ago and was found in the state of Montana, has a Y-chromosome that was initially determined to Q-L54*(xM3) but is now assigned, along with modern Native American sample, to a subclade of Q-Z780, Q-FGC47532, or to Q1b-M971.

Associated SNPs 
Q-Z780 is currently defined by the Z780 SNP.

Subgroups 
This is Thomas Krahn at the Genomic Research Center's Draft tree Proposed Tree for haplogroup Q-Z780.

 Q-Z780 Z780
 Q-L191 L191
 Q-L400 L400, L401

See also
Human Y-chromosome DNA haplogroup

Y-DNA Q-M242 subclades

Y-DNA backbone tree

References

External links 
The Y-DNA Haplogroup Q Project

Q-Z780